Rob Fisher is an American music director, conductor, arranger and pianist. He was the founding music director and conductor of the New York City Center Encores! series from 1994 to 2005. He is the leader of the Coffee Club Orchestra, which was the house band for Garrison Keillor’s radio broadcasts from 1989 to 1993.

Early career and education 
Fisher grew up in Norfolk, Virginia, where he began taking piano lessons at age 6. He received a BA from Duke University and an MA in piano performance from American University. In 2016, Fisher received an Honorary Doctorate of Music from Mansfield University.

After Fisher arrived in New York City as the onstage pianist for the musical revue A History of the American Film in 1978, he worked on the Berkshire Theatre Festival’s production of the 1933 George and Ira Gershwin musical Let 'Em Eat Cake—the first-ever revival of the piece. Later that year, he was a guest pianist for "By Ira... By George," a gala benefit concert at Carnegie Hall celebrating the 80th Anniversary of the birth of George Gershwin that featured Ginger Rogers, Cab Calloway, Barbara Cook, Michael Feinstein and others.

After several years of regional theater and Broadway National tours, in 1987 Fisher was enlisted to prepare the musical artists for the international Gershwin Celebration at the Brooklyn Academy of Music, which featured performers such as Leonard Bernstein, Mikhail Baryshnikov, Bob Dylan. This led to his conducting concert productions the Gershwins' Of Thee I Sing and Let ‘Em Eat Cake under the guidance of noted conductor Michael Tilson Thomas, who was the music director of the entire three-week celebration. These productions continued a professional association with the works of George Gershwin, one further cemented in the late 1990s when Fisher served as the artistic advisor of Carnegie Hall's two-year Gershwin Centennial Celebration, and most recently when he supervised the creation of the score for the Broadway musical An American in Paris.

Encores! Great American Musicals in Concert 
An aficionado of the Great American Songbook and the Golden Age of musical theater, Fisher was pivotal in the 1994 founding of New York City Center's Encores! Great American Musicals in Concert, an annual series dedicated to presenting the complete scores of rarely-heard musicals. The series was praised widely and was awarded the Lucille Lortel Award for Off-Broadway Special Achievement in 1995, the Jujamcyn Theater Award in 1997, several Outer Critics Circle Awards, and a Tony Honor for Excellence in Theatre in 2000. For his contributions to Encores!, Fisher himself received the 1997 Lucille Lortel Award for Outstanding Special Achievement. Fisher has made numerous recordings for Encores!, including the Grammy Award-winning Chicago cast recording.

Fisher served as music director and conductor of Encores! from 1994 through 2005. He continues to be a regular guest music director for the series.

Several Encores! productions conducted by Fisher eventually transferred to Broadway for commercial productions. Most notable of these is Chicago, which has gone on to become Broadway's second longest running show as well as Broadway's longest running revival. Fisher remains supervising music director for Chicago productions worldwide.

Concert and recording work 
In addition to Fisher's work for theatrical productions, he is a frequent guest of orchestras across the United States, both as a conductor and as a piano soloist. With the New York Philharmonic, he conducted concert versions of Carousel (for which he received an Emmy nomination for Outstanding Musical Director) and My Fair Lady. With the Orchestra of St. Luke's, he led gala performances of Candide, Guys and Dolls, and The Sound of Music at Carnegie Hall. In 2001, he conducted the San Francisco Symphony in the Emmy-winning concert production of Sweeney Todd starring Patti LuPone and George Hearn, which was subsequently released on DVD.

Fisher conducted the New York Pops frequently between 2004 and 2008, frequently sharing concerts with Skitch Henderson as well as leading the orchestra for many holiday concerts and special events. Additionally, he has appeared with the Boston and Chicago Symphonies, the Philadelphia and Cleveland orchestras, the Los Angeles Philharmonic, and the San Francisco, Atlanta, Pittsburgh, Baltimore, and National symphonies. As a pianist, Fisher has been soloist for Gershwin's Rhapsody in Blue and Concerto in F with multiple orchestras across the country.

In addition to collaborating in concert with such artists as Renée Fleming, Kristin Chenoweth, Kelli O’Hara, Victoria Clark, Idina Menzel, Brian Stokes Mitchell, and David Hyde Pierce, he has conducted many engagements with Patti LuPone, including ones with the Pacific, Phoenix, Atlanta, Fort Worth, and Chicago symphonies.

He has recorded dozens of albums as conductor and music director, serving as producer of several of them—including the recent Original Broadway Cast Recording of An American in Paris, for which he received a Grammy-nomination as Producer. Most recently, Fisher was the music supervisor, conductor, and an arranger for Renée Fleming's 2018 album Broadway, produced by multiple Grammy-winning David Frost.

As an arranger, he has had choral arrangements published by Hal Leonard and has contributed vocal arrangements to numerous shows and recordings. For the opening night of Carnegie Hall's 2018-2019 season, he arranged a duet for Audra McDonald and Renée Fleming with the San Francisco Symphony and Michael Tilson Thomas.

From 1989 to 1993, Fisher was music director for Garrison Keillor's “American Radio Company,” leading the program's house band, the Coffee Club Orchestra. He remained a frequent guest on Keillor's “A Prairie Home Companion” until Keillor's retirement.

Theater credits

Broadway 
 Living on Love (2015) — music consultant and arranger
 An American in Paris (2015) — musical score adaptor, arranger, and supervisor
 Anything Goes (2011) — music supervisor and vocal arranger
 Hair (2009) — music supervisor
 The Apple Tree (2006) — music supervisor and vocal arranger
 Wonderful Town (2003) — music supervisor and vocal arranger
 Chicago (1996) — music director/conductor (and music supervisor for all productions worldwide)
 The Threepenny Opera (1989) — conductor
 Little Johnny Jones (1982) — vocal arranger
 A Day in Hollywood/A Night in the Ukraine (1980) — offstage pianist
 A History of the American Film (1978) — onstage pianist

Encores!
music director/conductor for all productions below

 2019: I Married an Angel
2015: Lady, Be Good!
 2013: On Your Toes
 2010: Girl Crazy
 2008: No, No, Nanette
 2007: Face the Music
 2005: A Tree Grows in Brooklyn • The Apple Tree
 2004: Pardon My English • Bye Bye Birdie
 2003: The New Moon • No Strings
 2002: Carnival • Golden Boy • The Pajama Game
 2001: A Connecticut Yankee • Bloomer Girl • Hair
 2000: On a Clear Day You Can See Forever • Tenderloin • Wonderful Town
 1999: Babes in Arms • Ziegfeld Follies of 1936
 1998: Strike Up the Band • Li'l Abner • St. Louis Woman
 1997: Sweet Adeline • Promises, Promises • The Boys from Syracuse
 1996: Du Barry Was a Lady • One Touch of Venus • Chicago
 1995: Call Me Madam • Out of This World • Pal Joey
 1994: Fiorello! • Allegro • Lady in the Dark

Off-Broadway 
 Hair (Delacorte Theater, 2008) — music supervisor
 Two Gentlemen of Verona (Delacorte Theater, 2005) — music supervisor
 Saturday Night (Second Stage Theater, 2000) — music director/conductor
 Snoopy (Lamb's Theatre, 1982) — conductor, pianist
 Trixie True, Teen Detective (Lucille Lortel Theatre, 1980) — music director, vocal arranger

Discography

References

External links 
 AMP Worldwide Artist Page
 

American male conductors (music)
Year of birth missing (living people)
Living people
21st-century American conductors (music)
21st-century American male musicians